Sheykhabad (also Romanized as Sheykhābād, Shaikhābād, and Sheikh Abad) is a village in Jolgeh-e Mazhan Rural District, Jolgeh-e Mazhan District, Khusf County, South Khorasan Province, Iran. At the 2006 census, its population was 31, in 13 families.

References 

Populated places in Khusf County